Imoto (written 井本) is a Japanese surname. Notable people with the surname include:

, Japanese comedian
, Japanese politician
, Japanese military officer
, Japanese swimmer
, Japanese footballer

Japanese-language surnames